Mittweida is a former district in Saxony, Germany. It was bounded by (from the north and clockwise) the districts Muldentalkreis, Döbeln, Freiberg, the district-free city Chemnitz and the district Chemnitzer Land, the district Altenburger Land in Thuringia and the district Leipziger Land.

History 
In 1994 the district was created, when the previous districts Hainichen, Rochlitz and part the district Chemnitz were merged. In August 2008, as a part of the district reform in Saxony, the districts of Döbeln, Freiberg and Mittweida were merged into the new district Mittelsachsen.

Geography 
The district was located in the foothills of the Ore Mountains, only the area in the northwest around Rochlitz belongs to the Leipzig Bay. In this area is also the lowest elevation with 144 m above sea level; the highest elevation is in Hausdorf (part of Frankenberg) with 488 m.
The three main rivers in the district are the Zwickauer Mulde, Chemnitz and Zschopau.

Coat of arms

Towns and municipalities

External links 

  (German)